Stellio Lorenzi (7 May 1921 – 25 September 1990) was a French screenwriter. His father was from Sanremo. He was a communist.

Early Years 
Stellio Lorenzi was born in Paris to an Italian father from Sanremo. He spent his childhood and adolescence in Cannes then moved to the capital. After three years of graduate studies in mathematics, he turned to architectural. The entrance exam to the École Polytechnique was forbidden to him, because the laws of the Vichy regime refused access to the sons of foreigners. In 1944, he was assistant director to Jacques Becker on Paris Frills. He continued this career until 1951 with directors such as Jacques de Baroncelli, Marc Maurette, Louis Daquinor and Gilles Grangier.

References

1921 births
1990 deaths
French film directors
French male screenwriters
French screenwriters
Writers from Paris
French people of Italian descent
People of Ligurian descent
French communists
20th-century French screenwriters